Ostad Ebrahim Banna Esfahani was an Iranian architect who flourished in 17th-century Safavid Iran. Born to Ostad Esmail Banna Esfahani, he hailed from Isfahan and in all likelihood descended from a family of distinguished craftsmen, for he and his father are referred to as "master" (ostād). His name is attested on two tiles; at the tomb of Abdussamad Esfahani in Natanz and at the Jameh Mosque of Isfahan. On both tiles, Ostad Ebrahim is referred to as the "builder from Isfahan".

Sources
 
 

17th-century architects
17th-century people of Safavid Iran
Iranian architects
People from Isfahan